Masseteric is an adjective meaning "of or pertaining to the Masseter muscle", such as:
 Masseteric artery
 Masseteric nerve